Mimorista jamaicalis is a moth in the family Crambidae. It was described by Frank Haimbach in 1915. It is found in Jamaica.

References

Moths described in 1915
Spilomelinae